Clarin or Clarín may refer to:

Geography
Clarin, Bohol, a municipality in the province of Bohol, Philippines
Clarin, Misamis Occidental, a municipality in the province of Misamis Occidental, Philippines
River Clarin, a river in Ireland

Media
Clarín Group, an Argentine media conglomerate
Clarín (Argentine newspaper)
Clarín Awards, awards sponsored by the newspaper above
Clarín (Chilean newspaper)

People 
Clarín (Leopoldo Alas, 1852–1901), Spanish writer
Hans Clarin (1929–2005), German actor
Irene Clarin (born 1955), German television and theatre actress

Other uses
CLARIN, a European research network for the humanities and social sciences 
Clarín 580 AM, a Uruguayan radio station specializing in tango
Clarin-1, protein; see CLRN1

See also
Clarins, French cosmetics company
Clarion (disambiguation)